Emanuel Vogel Gerhart (Freeburg, Pennsylvania, 13 June 1817 – Lancaster, Pennsylvania, 6 May 1904) was an American minister of the German Reformed Church and first president of Franklin and Marshall College.

Early life and education
Gerhart was born on June 13, 1817, in Freeburg, Snyder County, Pennsylvania. His parents were the Reverend Isaac Gerhart (1788–1865) and Sarah Vogel Gerhart (1790–1861).

Gerhart's great-grandfather, Peter Gerhart, emigrated from the town of Alsace, France, to Bucks County, Pennsylvania, in the early 18th century. Emmanuel Gerhart's mother, of French descent, grew up in Philadelphia but was born in Northhampton, PA, while his father led ministries of German Reformed churches in several counties, including Union County, Snyder County, and Lancaster County, Pennsylvania.

In the early years of his education, Gerhart went to the Classical Institution of the Reformed Church in York, Pennsylvania, under the leadership of Rev. Frederich Rauch. The school included a rigorous training in philosophy, history, math, science, Greek and Latin based on the German education system.  At this school, Gerhart was one of the first members and developers of the Diagnothian Literary Society in 1835.

The school he attended moved to Mercersburg in 1836 and was established as Marshall College (later to become Franklin and Marshall College). Gerhart would graduate from Marshall College in 1838  and from Mercersburg Theological Seminary in 1841. At the seminary, Gerhart studied under Frederick Augustus Rauch and John Williamson Nevin, who were leading figures in the founding of Mercersburg Theology. During this time, Gerhart became a teacher at the Preparatory Department of Education and at the school for young women.

Pastorship and professorship

Gerhart began his ministry work during his studies at seminary and was approved by the Synod of the Reformed Church to minister in Reading, Pennsylvania. In 1849, Gerhart worked with the First Reformed Church in Cincinnati, Ohio. There he ministered to German immigrants and later traveled various states including Kentucky, Indiana, and Wisconsin to form new congregations. Starting in 1843, Gerhart would become an elected representative to the various church Synods and the General Synod in Baltimore.

He acted as president of Heidelberg College in 1851, after which he became professor of theology in the Theological Seminary of Tiffin, Ohio, whence he was called to the presidency of Franklin and Marshall College in 1855, where he held the title as Professor of Mental and Moral Philosophy. As president, Gerhart campaigned for the college to decrease debts and increase the student body and lead the college during the time of the Civil War.  In 1868, he was appointed professor of Systematic Theology at Mercersburg Theological Seminary, today called Lancaster Theological Seminary in Lancaster, Pennsylvania. He would continue there as president and professor for the rest of his life. Gerhart was also the editor of the Mercerbsburg Review journal for several years.

During his time as professor and president, Gerhart delivered several speeches. He was known to be very gregarious and articulate in speech. According to the Alumni Association of Franklin and Marshall, "his unruffled manner, his deliberateness of speech and the logical cast of his mind always came into service." He was said to have displayed a particular "energy and endurance" and had a strong and engaging presence at college events and games.

Works
Gerhart's works include over 60 articles published at the Mercersburg Review and the following:

Relation of Religion and Science: An Address, Delivered before the Alumni Association of Marshall College (1842)
An Introduction to the Study of Philosophy with an Outline Treatise on Logic (1857)
Christ the Source of Salvation, Lancaster, PA: Inquirer Printing and Publishing Company (1875)
Lectures on the Heidelberg Catechism, Lancaster, PA: Lecture Pringint Society of the Theological Seminary of the Reformed Church (1891)
Prolegomena to Christian Dogmatics (1891)
Institutes of Christian Religion (1891, 1894)

See also
German Reformed Church
German Americans
Mercersburg Theology
American philosophy
List of American philosophers

Notes

References
 Dictionary of Early American Philosophers. (2012). United Kingdom: Bloomsbury Publishing.
 Evans, W. B. (2019). A Companion to the Mercersburg Theology: Evangelical Catholicism in the Mid-Nineteenth Century. United States: Wipf and Stock Publishers.
 Gerhart, Emanuel V., Christocentric Reformed Theology in Nineteenth-Century America: Key Writings of Emanuel V. Gerhart. Edited by Annette G. Aubert. Eugene, OR: Wipf and Stock Publishers, 2021.

1817 births
1904 deaths
American philosophers
American theologians
Presidents of Franklin & Marshall College
Heidelberg University (Ohio)
Franklin & Marshall College alumni
Reformed Church in America members
People from Snyder County, Pennsylvania